Karl Ulrich Mayer (born 10 April 1945) is a German sociologist. He is Director Emeritus of the Max Planck Institute for Human Development in Berlin, Germany, as well as the Stanley B. Resor Professor Emeritus of Sociology and Professor at the Institution for Social and Policy Studies at Yale University. He was president of the Leibniz Association from 2010 to 2014 and chaired 
the Department of Sociology at Yale from 2005 to 2010. He was director of the Max Planck Institute for Human Development from 1983 to 2005, and was the founding editor of the European Sociological Review from 1985 to 1990.

Mayer is a member of the German National Academy of Sciences Leopoldina since 1998 and the Berlin-Brandenburg Academy of Sciences, a corresponding fellow of the British Academy since 2000, and a fellow of the American Academy of Arts and Sciences since 1996, the Academia Europaea since 1989, the American Association for the Advancement of Science, and the European Academy of Sociology.

References

External links
Faculty page at the Max Planck Institute for Human Development 
Faculty page at Yale University

Living people
1945 births
German sociologists
Yale University faculty
Academic journal editors
Corresponding Fellows of the British Academy
Fellows of the American Academy of Arts and Sciences
Members of Academia Europaea
Fellows of the American Association for the Advancement of Science
Members of the German Academy of Sciences Leopoldina
Max Planck Institute directors